Los Angeles Overnight is a 2018 American-Australian thriller film directed by Michael Chrisoulakis and featuring Lin Shaye, Sally Kirkland and Peter Bogdanovich.

Cast
Lin Shaye
Arielle Brachfield
Azim Rizik
Carey Fox
Julian Bane
Sally Kirkland
Peter Bogdanovich
Camilla Jackson
Ashley Park

Production
The film was shot entirely in Los Angeles.

Release
The film was released in theaters on March 9, 2018.  Then it was released in digital platforms on March 20 that same year.

Reception
Bobby LePire of Film Threat graded the film a C.

References

External links
 
 

American thriller films
Australian thriller films
2018 thriller films
Films shot in Los Angeles
2010s English-language films
2010s American films